L. irrorata can refer to a few different species.  The specific epithet  means 'moistened' or 'dewy.'

 Landemania irrorata, a synonym for Pelodiscus sinensis, the Chinese softshell turtle
 Lepidocephalichthys irrorata, the Loktak loach of the genus Lepidocephalichthys
 Libnotes irrorata, a cranefly in the genus Libnotes
 Lithosia irrorata, a synonym for Setina irrorella, the dew moth
 Littoraria irrorata, a snail known as the marsh periwinkle